The 1895 Villanova Wildcats football team represented Villanova University during the 1895 college football season. The team's captain was James A. McDonald.

Schedule

References

Villanova
Villanova Wildcats football seasons
Villanova Wildcats football